Guioa novobritannica is a species of plant in the family Sapindaceae. It is endemic to Papua New Guinea.

References

novobritannica
Endemic flora of Papua New Guinea
Trees of Papua New Guinea
Flora of the Bismarck Archipelago
Vulnerable plants
Taxonomy articles created by Polbot